Hamara Ghar (Our Home) is a 1950 Hindi family drama film made by 'Hindustan Chitra' and directed by Nanabhai Bhatt (father of Mahesh and Mukesh Bhatt). Music is by Chitragupta Shrivastava. The cast was Durga Khote, Umakant Desai, Veera, Agha, Meena Kumari, Geeta Bose, David, Jankidas, Ramesh Gupta etc. Lyrics were by Anjum, Rammurthy Chaturvedi and Bharat Vyas.

Storyline
The story is of a family consisting of a mother and her five sons. A relative causes discord. The mother argues they need to stay united like the walls of a room to avoid collapse.

Cast
 Durga Khote
 Umakant Desai, 
 Veera
 Agha
 Meena Kumari
 Geeta Bose 
 David 
 Jankidas
 Ramesh Gupta

Soundtrack

References

External links

1950 films
1950s Hindi-language films
Films scored by Chitragupta
Indian drama films
1950 drama films
Indian black-and-white films